Fanuankuwel is a "place of a whale with two tails" location in Pacific and Polynesian mythology, recorded in the traditional celestial navigation techniques of the Caroline Islands. Part of the Trigger fishes tied together mnemonic-navigational system, it is sometimes grouped with Kafeŕoor as a 'ghost island'.

See also
celestial navigation
Kafeŕoor
Polynesian mythology
Polynesian navigation
Micronesian navigation
Wa (watercraft)

References

Polynesian mythology
Celestial navigation
Mythological islands